Friends of Europe is a Brussels-based, not-for-profit think tank for European Union policy analysis and debate.

History

The organisation, established in 1999, has no political or national allegiance and is independent of the EU institutions. Its goal is to foster open discussion and to stimulate new thinking on the issues facing Europe and its citizens.

Themes
The organisation's activities focus in particular on five thematic areas: Climate, Energy & Sustainability, Peace, Security & Defence, Health, Digital & Data Governance and Global Europe.

These areas of expertise converge towards five strategic objectives: the promotion of new leadership, democracy regeneration, challenging inequalities of opportunities, bolstering a green transformation and reframing Europe's role in the world.

Board of trustees
Friends of Europe's board of trustees is composed of 81 people who hold, or have held positions of responsibility in European affairs. Its President is Etienne Davignon, a politician, businessman and former vice-president of the European Commission. Additionally, there are 15 members of the Praesidium, some of which are:

 Pat Cox, President of the European Movement International and former President of the European Parliament
 Jean-Luc Dehaene, former Prime Minister of Belgium and vice-president of the Convention on the Future of Europe
 Mario Monti, Italy's prime minister
 Pascal Lamy, Director-General of the World Trade Organization (WTO) and former European Commissioner for Trade
 Guy Verhofstadt, former Prime Minister of Belgium
 António Vitorino, former European Commissioner for Justice and Home Affairs and former Portuguese Defence Minister and Deputy Prime Minister

Friends of Europe's Secretary-General is Giles Merritt, a former Brussels correspondent of the Financial Times.

Funding

In 2021, Friends of Europe's funding revenue was €4 751 818. This money was contributed through participation fees ("memberships"), institutional and governmental subsidies, contributions to costs of events, reports or other projects.

The breakdown per source of funding is as follows:

European and international institutions: €2 050 894 (43%)
Diplomatic missions, national, regional and local authorities: €1 399 249 (29%)
Corporate sector (compaies and trade associations): €779 102 (16%)
Private non corporate sector (foundations and NGOs): €170 758 (5%)
Participation fees ("Membership"): €351 815 (7%)

The European Commission contributed the largest sum of money through a mixture of structural support and project-support.

Out of all NGOs and think tanks, Friends of Europe received the tenth largest amount of funding from the European Commission in 2010 at €192,000.

Friends of Europe is registered on the EU Transparency register operated by the European Parliament & European Commission.

References

External links

 Friends of Europe

Political and economic think tanks based in Europe
Think tanks based in Belgium

de:Friends of Europe